Vuthaj may refer to:

A settlement (Vusanje in Serbian, Vuthaj in Albanian), a small town in Montenegro
Dardan Vuthaj (born 1995), Albanian football goalkeeper 

Albanian-language surnames